SK Uničov is a Czech football club located in Uničov, Czech Republic. It currently plays in the Moravian–Silesian Football League, which is the third tier of Czech football.

Historical names
 1935 – SK Union Uničov
 1952 – Sokol ZVIL Uničov
 1953 – DSO Spartak Uničov (Dobrovolná sportovní organizace Spartak Uničov)
 1966 – TJ Uničovské strojírny Uničov (Tělovýchovná jednota Uničovské strojírny Uničov)
 1994 – SK UNEX Uničov
 2006 – SK Uničov

Colours and Kit
SK Uničov have always worn navy blue shirts with white stripes, navy blue shorts and navy blue socks.
The team does not have traditional away colours. In 2010/11 the away kit is a yellow shirt with navy blue strips, navy blue shorts and yellow socks, but, as with most teams, they have some more unusual ones.

The kit is currently manufactured by Adidas. Previously, the kit was manufactured by Jako, Joma and Diadora.

References

External links
 Official website 

Football clubs in the Czech Republic
Association football clubs established in 1935
1935 establishments in Czechoslovakia
Olomouc District
Sport in the Olomouc Region